Woolsey Peak Wilderness is a protected wilderness area centered around its namesake Woolsey Peak, rising 2,500 feet to a summit at 3270 feet (996 m) in the Gila Bend Mountains in the U.S. state of Arizona.  Established in 1990 under the Arizona Desert Wilderness Act the area is managed by the Bureau of Land Management. This desert wilderness is best described as "a perfect example of pristine Sonoran Desert."

Adjacent to the Signal Mountain Wilderness to the north, divided only by a rugged jeep road, the area is broken up by ridges and ragged peaks interspersed in lava flows and basalt mesas. A Sonoran Desert ecosystem supports populations of mule deer, desert bighorn sheep, and javelina as well as bobcats and mountain lions.

See also
 List of Arizona Wilderness Areas
 List of U.S. Wilderness Areas
 King Woolsey

References

  – GNIS
  – GNIS

IUCN Category Ib
Wilderness areas of Arizona
Protected areas of Maricopa County, Arizona
Protected areas established in 1990
1990 establishments in Arizona